John O'Neill (October 18, 1829May 12, 1914) was a Canadian American immigrant, miner, farmer, and Democratic politician.  He served two terms in the Wisconsin State Assembly, representing western Lafayette County.

Biography
John O'Neill was born in Douglastown, in Miramichi, New Brunswick, in 1829.  In 1845, he emigrated with his parents and siblings to Lafayette County, in the Wisconsin Territory, where they all engaged in lead mining.  In 1846, the family acquired a tract of land in the town of Seymour from the federal land office.

In 1852, he crossed the country with an ox team to California, where he remained for several years.  Upon his return to Wisconsin in 1859, he engaged in farming and livestock raising.

He was a member of the Democratic Party and was elected chairman of the Shullsburg town board in 1872 and 1873.  In 1881, he was elected to the Wisconsin State Assembly for Lafayette County's 2nd (western) Assembly district.  He was subsequently re-elected in 1882.  He did not run for a third term in 1884.

Personal life
O'Neill never married and had no children.  He retired from his farm in the 1890s and went to live in the care of his brother's family.  His brother, Brien, preceded him in death, but his care continued under Brien's wife and children.  For the last five years of his life he was completely blind.  He suffered a stroke on the morning of Tuesday, May 12, 1914, and died that afternoon.  His body was interred at Saint Matthews Catholic Cemetery in Shullsburg.

Electoral history

Wisconsin Assembly (1881, 1882)

| colspan="6" style="text-align:center;background-color: #e9e9e9;"| General Election, November 8, 1881

| colspan="6" style="text-align:center;background-color: #e9e9e9;"| General Election, November 7, 1882

References

External links

British emigrants to the United States
People from Shullsburg, Wisconsin
Wisconsin city council members
1830 births
Year of death missing
Pre-Confederation Canadian emigrants to the United States
Democratic Party members of the Wisconsin State Assembly